RWDM may refer to:

 Royal White Daring Molenbeek, a former football club which dissolved in 2002 after financial difficulties.
 RWDM47, a football club founded in 2015 to reinstate the history of the former club.

See also
 R.W.D.M. Brussels F.C., a club renamed in 2003 and claimed as a successor of Royal White Daring Molenbeek